In algebraic geometry, a quartic threefold is a degree 4 hypersurface of dimension 3 in 4-dimensional projective space. 
 showed that all non-singular quartic threefolds are irrational, though some of them are unirational.

Examples
Burkhardt quartic
Igusa quartic

References

3-folds